Richard Mganga Ndassa (21 March 1959 – 29 April 2020) was a Tanzanian CCM politician and Member of Parliament for Sumve constituency from 2010 until his death in 2020 from COVID-19.

References

1959 births
2020 deaths
Chama Cha Mapinduzi MPs
Tanzanian MPs 2010–2015
Tanzanian MPs 2015–2020
Tanzanian MPs 2020–2025
Buluba Secondary School alumni
College of Business Education alumni
Deaths from the COVID-19 pandemic in Tanzania